Rockit Hong Kong Music Festival was held each autumn from 2003 to 2006 in Hong Kong's Victoria Park.  The event was created by Nimal Jayawardena (AKA NJ Fujii) and Didier Li of Matrix Entertainment Group.

2003
The first Rockit festival, 25–26 October 2003, was headlined by Japanese Metal Band Electric Eel Shock and Australia's Regurgitator.

 Electric Eel Shock
 Regurgitator
 The Feelers
 Finley Quaye
 Mark Gardener
 Gold Rush
 Six by Seven
 DJ Marky & XRS
 Stamina MC
 A Guy Called Gerald

 DJ Suv Live Showcase
 Leslie Loh
 Spanish Harlem Orchestra
 DJ Bodhi
 Simon Pang
 Uncle Joe
 Audiotraffic
 White Label
 Whence He Came
 P.N.S.

 Boombox Soundsystem
 SemIQ
 Buddhiston

2004
In 2004 the event coincided with a three-day weekend (22–24 October) so the organisers extended the event to the Friday afternoon. The headliners were The Cooper Temple Clause on the Saturday and Regurgitator on the Sunday.

 The Cooper Temple Clause
 Regurgitator
 Aqualung
 Dive Dive
 5,6,7,8′s
 DJ Krust
 DJ Die
 Dynamite MC
 MC Tali
 Amil Khan

 Joris Voorn
 DJ Godfather
 Josie Ho
 The Pancakes
 Audiotraffic
 DJ Kien Lieu
 Invincible
 Waxed Apple
 King Ly Chee
 My Little Airport

 DJ Tommy
 22 Cats
 Kai Hii Kitora
 Zoundz
 Over A Dogma
 Alok′s 31G
 Malfunction
 Robot
 Garoupa
 Nude

 Nothing None
 Fantastic Day
 Flowers of Babylon
 Climax
 UNiXX

2005
Rockit 2005 was held 12–13 November.

 Feeder
 DJ Marky & Stamina MC
 Princess Superstar
 Joris Voorn
 Thierry Nkeli Faha
 Soler
 The Academy
 Uptown Rockers
 Robot
 Shotgun She-ras

 Frankie Lam
 Qiu Hong
 Dirt Star
 Nude
 Hardpack
 SiQ
 Helter Skelter
 The Darlings
 Ghost Style
 Little Fat Pig

 Natural City
 Audiotraffic
 We Shot Kennedy

Brian Jonestown Massacre were scheduled to headline the Saturday but cancelled 24 hours before the show.

2006
Rockit 2006 was held 14–15 October.

 Ian Brown
 Goldie
 Anthony Wong Yiu-Ming
 Adam F
 Electric Eel Shock
 Tookoo
 Bryan G
 Frankie Lam
 Uptown Rockers
 Qiu Hong

 Little Fat Pig
 Robot
 The Yours
 Hardpack
 The Academy
 Shotgun She-Ras
 Garoupa
 Noughts and Exes
 Empire
 Atomic Bubbles

 dr.eggs
 The Sinister Left
 The Dragon Army
 Spencer Douglas

The Rockit Website has a video feature highlighting the local bands trying out to Play At Rockit. Interesting look at the Hong Kong Indie Music scene.

Legacy
Rockit ceased in 2006, largely because of difficulties in securing necessary permissions from Hong Kong government.  In 2009, the organisers announced a multi-stage music and arts event in Macau, called Mima Revolution. Music directors Jay Forster and Justin Sweeting together with Mike Hill went on to found the Clockenflap festival from 2008.

See also
Clockenflap

References

External links
Rockit Hong Kong Music Festival – Official website.
Rockit 2005 photos and info

Music festivals in Hong Kong